Zuzana Kečkéšová (born 1980) is a Slovak-American molecular biologist at the Institute of Organic Chemistry and Biochemistry of the Czech Academy of Sciences. She investigates the reasons that certain organs are protected from cancer.

Early life and education 
Kečkéšová is from Galanta. She became interested in science as a child and considered becoming an astrophysicist. She studied molecular biology at the Charles University in Prague and graduated in 2003. During her undergraduate degree, she attended the London International Youth Science Forum where she was selected by the British consulate to represent Slovakia. Her research career began in Prague, where she studied the lifecycle of the murine polyomavirus. She became interested in attending Western universities and began her preparation, but did not have the funding to cover her fees. After learning that University College London offered full scholarships to students from Central European countries, Kečkéšová joined University College London in 2003, where she worked toward a doctoral degree in infectious diseases. Her thesis considered retroviral infections and was awarded the Qiagen Award. During her PhD, she spent a year at Columbia University where she looked at post-translational modifications of retroviral restriction factors.

Research and career 
After earning her doctorate, Kečkéšová joined the laboratory of Robert Weinberg at Whitehead Institute for Biomedical Research at Massachusetts Institute of Technology. At Massachusetts Institute of Technology Kečkéšová worked on the metabolic processes of cancer cells and the molecular networks of stem cells. Whilst reading the countless scientific studies into the organs that cancer attacks, Kečkéšová became interested in the cells that it did not attack, and began to study cancer metastasis and the mechanisms of tumour growth. She joined the Institute of Organic Chemistry and Biochemistry (IOCB) of the Czech Academy of Sciences in 2017. Kečkéšová discovered that the protein LACTB can act as a tumour suppressant. She demonstrated that activation of LACTB in cancer cells can result in the death of cells; by altering the composition of lipids in cancer mitochondria.

She was awarded a European Molecular Biology Organization (EMBO) Installation Grant to study the vulnerabilities of cancer cells in 2017. In 2018 Kečkéšová was awarded a €1.75 million grant from BTCZ Ventures to support her research into the mechanisms by which cancer impacts the human body. Under the collaboration, Kečkéšová will retain rights to the intellectual property of her research, whilst BTCZ will own licenses for future patents.

Selected publications 
Her publications include:

Personal life 
Kečkéšová has two children.

References 

Slovak scientists
People from Galanta
Charles University alumni
Alumni of University College London
Molecular biologists
Women molecular biologists
1980 births
Living people
Institute of Organic Chemistry and Biochemistry of the CAS